Sipple (1941–1989) is American soldier and activist Oliver Sipple.

Sipple also may refer to:
 Donald Sipple (fl. 1990s), American political worker & subject of expose by Jeff Klein
 Sipple, fictional character in Arthur television series
 Sipple Avenue, in Fullerton, Baltimore County, Maryland
 Sipple Farm, located on Sipple Avenue in Fullerton, Baltimore County, Maryland

See also 
 Siple (disambiguation)